Ramonkodogo is a town in the Ramongo Department of Boulkiemdé Province, in central western Burkina Faso, with a population of 1,583.

References

External links
Satellite map at Maplandia.com

Populated places in Boulkiemdé Province